Okara railway station (Urdu and ) is located in Okara, of Punjab province, Pakistan.

History
The railway station was built in 1927 during British India era.

See also
 List of railway stations in Pakistan
 Pakistan Railways

References

Railway stations in Okara District
Railway stations on Karachi–Peshawar Line (ML 1)
1927 establishments in British India